Thar Pike Kaung is a 2018 Burmese comedy-drama film, directed by Steel (Dwe Myittar) starring Htun Htun, Soe Myat Thuzar and Shwe Thamee. The film, produced by Arr Mhan Film Production premiered Myanmar on June 8, 2018.

Cast
Htun Htun as Phoe Shwe La Min
Shwe Thamee as May Yin Kyay
Soe Myat Thuzar as Daw Yin Nit
Dain Daung as Aung Mat
May Kabyar Oo as May Barani
Min Oo as Father of May Yin Kyay

References

2018 films
2010s Burmese-language films
Burmese comedy-drama films
Films shot in Myanmar
2018 comedy-drama films